Codognè ( or ; , spelled also Codogné) is a comune (municipality) in the Province of Treviso in the Italian region Veneto, located about  north of Venice and about  northeast of Treviso.

Codognè borders the following municipalities: Fontanelle, Gaiarine, Godega di Sant'Urbano, Mareno di Piave, San Fior, San Vendemiano and Vazzola.

References

Cities and towns in Veneto